Warriors of the World is the ninth album by heavy metal band Manowar, released on June 4, 2002. The song Nessun Dorma was dedicated to Adams's mother who had died earlier that year. Amongst its varied tracks are tributes to Wagner, Pavarotti, and Elvis Presley. The album peaked at #2 on the German charts.

The song "Warriors of the World United" had a music video filmed in 2002. Director Neil Johnson solely owns the rights to the music video.

Track listing 
All songs written by Joey DeMaio, except where noted.

Personnel 
 Eric Adams – vocals
 Karl Logan – guitars, keyboards
 Joey DeMaio – bass, keyboards
 Scott Columbus – drums

Additional personnel
 Ken Kelly - cover artwork

Charts

Certifications

External links 
 Lyrics at darklyrics.com
 Official artist website

References 

2002 albums
Manowar albums
Albums with cover art by Ken Kelly (artist)